In the Long Grass was the sixth studio album by The Boomtown Rats, released in 1984 in the UK and 1985 in the US. It was the band's last studio material for over three-decade until 2020's Citizens of Boomtown.

The Boomtown Rats' least commercially favourable effort, it failed to appear altogether in the UK Albums Chart, but did reach No. 188 in the US Billboard 200.

Track listing
All songs written by Bob Geldof except where indicated.
 "A Hold of Me" - 4:57
 "Drag Me Down" - 4:31
 "Dave" - 4:19
 "Over Again" - 3:45
 "Another Sad Story" (Johnny Fingers) - 3:42
 "Tonight" - 3:53
 "Hard Times" - 3:54
 "Lucky" (J. Fingers) - 3:37
 "An Icicle in the Sun" - 3:50
 "Up or Down" (Simon Crowe, Pete Briquette) - 3:33

1985 US listing
For the US, the record company insisted that the track "Dave" needed to be reworked before it could be released in that country. Geldof had written "Dave" for Dave MacHale, an Irish saxophonist and keyboard player, after his girlfriend died of a heroin overdose in 1983. New lyrics were written and sung over the same backing track; the new track was called "Rain".
All songs written by Bob Geldof except where indicated.
 "A Hold of Me"
 "Drag Me Down"
 "Rain"
 "Over Again"
 "Another Sad Story" (J. Fingers)
 "Tonight"
 "Hard Times"
 "Lucky" (J. Fingers)
 "An Icicle in the Sun"
 "Up or Down" (S. Crowe, P. Briquette)

2005 bonus tracks
 "Dave" (Single Version)
 "Walking Downtown" (B. Geldof, P. Briquette) (B-side)
 "Precious Time" (S. Crowe) (B-side)
 "She's Not the Best" (Home Demo)

Personnel
The Boomtown Rats
 Bob Geldof – vocals
 Pete Briquette – bass, vocals
 Johnnie Fingers – keyboards, vocals
 Simon Crowe – drums, vocals
 Garry Roberts – guitar, vocals
Additional personnel
 Peter Thoms - trombone (credited on the sleeve as Pete "Gidday" Thomas) 
 Luke Tunney - trumpet
 Guy Barker - trumpet
 Gary Barnacle - saxophone
 Martin Dobson - saxophone
 Peter Claridge - guitar
 Molly and Polly - backing vocals on "Hard Times"
 Ian Ritchie - saxophone
 Bob Carter - arrangement on "Tonight"
Technical
 Martin Rex - engineer
 Bob Clearmountain - mixing
 Ashworth - photography

References

The Boomtown Rats albums
1984 albums
Albums produced by James Guthrie (record producer)